BOBMC Rider Mania (BOBMC RM) is an event hosted by Brotherhood of Bulleteers Motorcycling Consortium (BOBMC) member clubs in India every year. It is the annual gathering of Indian Royal Enfield motorcycle owners. The event was initiated by Vernon Dias in 2003 to commemorate the spirit of motorcycling. Riders and biking clubs across the country gather for the two-day fest.

It is an annual event, organized by different host clubs of BOBMC in a place of their choice, and the 2014 event was hosted by the Madras Bulls in Chennai on 18 and 19 January 2014. Over 800 riders had registered for event as reported by Overdrive  in two weeks of opening registrations. The BOBMC Rider Mania, since it is hosted by a club changes its venue to the home of the hosting club and has, thus, travelled the length and breadth of India including Goa, Mumbai, Hyderabad, Ooty, Nagpur, Kolkata, Delhi and Shillong in the North east among others. It was hosted by Road Survivors chandigarh In 2015, Indiethumpers, Mumbai in 2018 and in 2019 India Bull Riders placed a milestone at Udaipur by the name of #AanDo BOBMC Rider Mania 2019.

History

2003 - 2004: Early Years 

Rider Mania dates back to 2003 when it was first hosted in Goa and approximately 74 bikers attended. Rider Mania 2004 was again organized in Goa on 10 January at Riva resorts in North Goa and approximately 130 bikers attended.

2005 to Present 

Starting 2005 it was hosted by BOBMC member clubs, beginning with Inddiethumpers, Mumbai. The event was held at Raigarh Resorts, Panvel on 8 January in which over 360 riders participated.

In 2006 it was hosted by Madras Bulls Motorcycling Club. Over 400 bikers participated and it was held at Casuarina Bay Beach Resort on 21 Jan, Chennai.

In 2007, Rider Mania was hosted by Wanderlust Motorcycling Club at Star Key Point Resorts, Nagpur on 24 January. 199 Bikers participated.

In 2008, The Wanderers from Hyderabad organized it at Ramoji Film City on 18 January. Around 400 bikers participated.

In 2009, it was hosted by Rolling Thunder Motorcycling Club and was called the RIDER MANIA RTMC Ishtyle. It was held at Ooty on 24 January. 670 riders participated.

In 2010, Inddie Thumpers from Mumbai hosted it. The event was named as RMX and was held at Vikram Garh on 24 January, at a resort outside Mumbai. Around 650 riders joined the fest.

In 2011, #Eastern Bulls hosted the event and called it the RM-East. Held on 22 January 2011 the event witnessed over 550 people.

In 2012, the event went to Gurgaon hosted by Royal Beasts, New Delhi which saw over 700 riders participate.

In 2013, it was hosted by Royal Enfield Riders Association of Meghalaya (RERAM) in Cherrapunji. It was attended by over 400 riders. FORE (Friends of Royal Enfield, Nepal was the sole club from outside of India.

In 2014, the Madras Bulls Motorcycling Club (MBMC), hosted the Rider Mania. Announced as the biggest Rider Mania till that year, it pulled around 1200+ avid bullet riders  from across India and Nepal. Held on 18 and 19 January 2014 at Mahabalipuram.

In 2015,the Road survivors(RS) hosted the Rider Mania #dohajarpandrah  at kikar lodge and around 900+ bikers attended the event from all over the india and nepal

In 2016, Wanderlust Motorcycle Club from Nagpur hosted the Rider Mania. They titled it "Full Power". Wanderlust MC broke Madras Bulls' record & presented the Biggest ever Rider Mania till 2016. More than 1700 Royal Enfield lovers were the witness of the RM16. It was held at Nagpur outside village named Waki.

In 2017 Rider Mania Rolling Thunder Motorcycle Club (RTMC) of Bangalore. RTMC along with volunteer clubs from the country, formed the "Southern Squadron" to host the RM17 at Arabian sea coastal area Kundapur. It is about 450 km west from Bangalore.

In 2018 Inddie Thumpers from Mumbai hosted again this time at a place called Bhor near Pune. This time they decided to call it MahaRM.

In 2019, #AANDO(i.e-"Let It Come") was the call for Motorcycle Riders all-over the world to participate in BOBMC Rider Mania 2019  hosted by India Bull Riders Motorcycle Club (IBRMC). This mega event took place at Paneri Farm House, Ghasiyar village(Udaipur), a remote place situated between the Aravali hills of Udaipur. #AANDO 2019 was a 'MileStone' in the history of BOBMCRM as the barren hills (mainly hills) were turned into amazing 'Event Ground' by the dedicated team of IBRMC. The clean sanitation facility in the middle of nowhere with 24 hrs hot water supply was a relief for all participants, especially female, during the bone breaking cold. There were many events but attraction was the 'Hill Race' and 'Dirt Track' race, both were set in the hills and enjoyed well by the participants. The event stage was set in the middle of the venue, surrounded by the residential facilities as well as the stalls, food court and the booze counter. In this event, RM Currency was designed by the team, which the participants could exchange with original currency and use it to purchase whatever they like in the event ground. The beautiful venue and the lively event was witnessed by approx. 1700 riders and their family members from India and abroad. The next BOBMCRM in 2020 will be held at Nepal and shall be hosted by FORE Nepal.

In 2020, #ChaloNepal (Lets Go to Nepal) was the tagline of the event BOBMC Rider Mania. This year BOBMCRM gone "International" and organized successfully at Nepal by "FORE" Motorcycle Club (FORE Stands for "Friends Of Royal Enfield"). In 2019, Brothers from FORE had ridden all the way from Nepal to attend BOBMCRM #AanDo 2019 at Udaipur and bagged the opportunity to host this event. This event's ground was set at Lake shore of Pame Lake, Pokhara(Nepal) surrounded by Pame lake at one side and other sides were covered by beautiful hills; Despite the challenge of flood ground, FORE team managed to set the ground well for the event and organized it very well. They setup the sanitation facilities very well to accommodate the large number of participants. The special attraction during the event was 'flower rain from the sky' on the participants and the traditional knife 'Khukhri' in the Goodies bag. On a laughter node, many people expected 'Khukhri Rum' in their Goodie Bag. Overall the event was awesome and especially for the people who opted for BYOT, they experienced the camping at another level. Few photographs of the event can be found through this link  and. The next BOBMCRM in 2021 will be held at Hyderabad (India) and shall be hosted by Wanderers motorcycle club.

After a long gap of two years, Wanderers Hyderabad hosted the BOBMC Rider Mania in 2022 at Hyderabad with the tagline "Ab ki baar, Chaarminar" (This time Chaarminar).  

HOI-KIW (Chalo-Chalo/Lets Go)- BOBMC Rider Mania 2023  will be conducted, at Orchid Lake Resort, Umiam, Shilong (Meghalaya) by Royal Enfield Rider's Association Meghalaya aka RERAM, from 21st January 2023 to 22nd January 2023 with the tagline "Hoi-Kiw" which means in Hindi 'Chalo-Chalo' and 'Lets Go' in English (a citation to motivate others to do something). BOBMC Rider Mania 2023 will be exciting for many riders as after long restrictions of Covid Lockdown, riders will get out from home to inhale the fresh air of the hills.

Brotherhood

All the clubs participating in Rider Mania are part of the Brotherhood of Bulleteers Motorcycling Consortium (BOBMC). In 2014, 52 of these clubs participated in Rider Mania '14.

The riders might be from different clubs, different states, speaking different languages, but what unites them is the brotherhood that every biker is proud to share. It is events like Rider Mania, North East Riders Meet, Gaddha Mania and anniversary gatherings of individual clubs that exemplify the brotherhood every biker talks about. The road brings us bikers together, and the brotherhood is all about like-minded people coming together to share the same passion. No one is alone on the highway, and you can get support some way or the other.

Music

Music is an integral part of the festival. The event usually features an open stage where event participants are encouraged to perform with the evenings seeing a professional band's performance.

References

External links 
 Official BOBMC Rider Mania Website

Motorcycle rallies in India